The 1967 NHL Expansion Draft was held on June 6, 1967, in the ballroom of the Queen Elizabeth Hotel in Montreal, Quebec.  The draft took place to fill the rosters of the league's six expansion teams for the 1967–68 season: the California Seals, Los Angeles Kings, Minnesota North Stars, Philadelphia Flyers, Pittsburgh Penguins and the St. Louis Blues.

Rules 
As this ambitious expansion doubled the league's size from six to twelve teams, a large number of players were needed to fill the rosters of the new franchises.  Almost all of the leading professional hockey players in North America were already under contract with the six existing franchises; therefore, the draft was established to equitably distribute players from the Original Six clubs (the Boston Bruins, Chicago Black Hawks, Detroit Red Wings, Montreal Canadiens, New York Rangers, and Toronto Maple Leafs) to the new teams.  Each expansion team was to select twenty players from the established clubs: two goaltenders and eighteen forwards and defencemen.  Thus, a total of 120 players were selected.

The existing clubs were allowed to exclude a goaltender and eleven other players from eligibility in the draft by naming them to "protected" lists. Also excluded from the draft were Junior players, players who were young enough to play Junior (born on or after June 1, 1946) but who were already playing professionally, and players sold to the minor league Western Hockey League and Central Professional Hockey League before June 1, 1966.

The draft began with the drawing of the draft order.  Each of the new teams' names was placed on a paper ballot enclosed in a capsule, which was drawn from the bowl of the Stanley Cup by NHL President Clarence Campbell. Montreal Canadiens general manager Sam Pollock helped Campbell draw up the rules for the draft. This draft order was used in the first round to draft goaltenders. The order was then reversed in the second round, which was again specifically for goaltenders. The third round retained the second round's order, and in every subsequent round the draft order would rotate, such that the team that had picked first in the previous round would pick last in the following round while the other teams moved up to fill its place.  Each expansion team had three minutes from the time of the previous selection to make its pick.

After each of the first, third, fourth, seventh and subsequent players lost by any of the established teams, the team in question chose one undrafted player that it had left unprotected and moved him onto their protected lists. Players who had played professionally for the first time in the 1966–67 season were ineligible from being picked until their respective team had filled their protected list with at least two goaltenders and eighteen other players.

Protected lists 

Boston: goaltender – Gerry Cheevers; skaters – John Bucyk, Ted Green, Ed Westfall, Tom Williams, John McKenzie, Don Awrey, Ken Hodge, Phil Esposito, Fred Stanfield, Eddie Shack and Gary Doak.  Among notable players who were initially unprotected but later added to the list as fills were Dallas Smith, Wayne Cashman, Eddie Johnston, Jean Pronovost, Ron Murphy, Glen Sather and Bob Leiter.
Chicago: goaltender – Denis DeJordy; skaters – Bobby Hull, Dennis Hull, Doug Jarrett, Chico Maki, Gilles Marotte, Pit Martin, Stan Mikita, Doug Mohns, Pierre Pilote, Ken Wharram and Pat Stapleton. Among notable players who were initially unprotected but later added to the list as fills were Eric Nesterenko, Wayne Maki and Dave Dryden.
Detroit: goaltender – Roger Crozier; skaters – Gordie Howe, Alex Delvecchio, Norm Ullman, Gary Bergman, Paul Henderson, Bruce MacGregor, Ted Hampson, Dean Prentice, Bert Marshall, Doug Roberts and Bob McCord. Among notable players who were initially unprotected but later added to the list as fills were Nick Libett, Howie Young, Gary Jarrett, Floyd Smith and Jim Watson.
Montreal: goaltender – Lorne Worsley; skaters – Jean Beliveau, Yvan Cournoyer, J. C. Tremblay, Jacques Laperriere, Ted Harris, Terry Harper, John Ferguson, Ralph Backstrom, Henri Richard, Gilles Tremblay and Bobby Rousseau. Among notable players who were initially unprotected but later added to the list as fills were Rogie Vachon, Claude Larose, Dick Duff, Carol Vadnais, Serge Savard, Danny Grant, Jacques Lemaire and Andre Boudrias.
New York: goaltender – Ed Giacomin; skaters – Jean Ratelle, Rod Gilbert, Vic Hadfield, Phil Goyette, Arnie Brown, Bob Nevin, Jim Neilson, Harry Howell, Don Marshall, Orland Kurtenbach and Wayne Hillman. Among notable players who were initially unprotected but later added to the list as fills were Gilles Villemure, Red Berenson, Reggie Fleming, Gary Sabourin and Bob Plager.
Toronto: goaltender – Johnny Bower; skaters – Frank Mahovlich, Dave Keon, Tim Horton, Larry Hillman, Bob Pulford, Jim Pappin, Marcel Pronovost, Mike Walton, Ron Ellis, Pete Stemkowski and Brian Conacher. Among notable players who were initially unprotected but later added to the list as fills were Al Smith, George Armstrong, Allan Stanley, Duane Rupp, Murray Oliver, Bronco Horvath, Don Cherry and Red Kelly.

Draft results 

The draft began with the picking of the draft order. The Kings picked first, with the North Stars, Flyers, Penguins, Seals and Blues following in that order.

With the first pick in the draft the Kings chose future Hall of Fame goaltender Terry Sawchuk, backbone of the great Detroit Red Wings teams of the 1950s and fresh off a Stanley Cup championship with the Maple Leafs.  The first skater chosen was center Gord Labossiere of the Canadiens, also by the Kings, as the 13th selection.

Commentators compared the draft to a rummage sale, with the Original Six losing only unnecessary if not unwanted players. Some of the expansion teams bolstered their rosters before the Draft by purchasing minor league teams outright, thus gaining the rights to the players on their rosters, such as the Springfield Indians of the American Hockey League by the Kings and the Quebec Aces of the AHL by the Flyers, while the North Stars purchased the rights to seven amateur members of the Canadian National Team from Toronto.  A poll of minor league sportswriters and executives, following the draft, felt that Philadelphia had gotten the best of the selections and Los Angeles the worst, while the Boston Bruins were the hardest hit of existing clubs.  Among the Bruins' players drafted were future Hall of Famer Bernie Parent and future All-Stars J. P. Parise, Poul Popiel, Wayne Connelly, Bill Goldsworthy, Gary Dornhoefer, Ron Schock and Wayne Rivers.  It was considered that the Canadiens – reported to have made a number of backroom deals to avoid losing valued unprotected players – fared the best of the established clubs, keeping unprotected talent such as Claude Larose, Carol Vadnais, Serge Savard and Danny Grant.

One controversy arose from the retirement of Toronto star Red Kelly, who was expected to become the Kings' coach.  As he was still under contract with the Maple Leafs, they had the rights to his services, but Leafs' general manager Punch Imlach insisted that the Kings use one of their picks to select him, and when this did not materialize, Imlach added Kelly to the Leafs' protected list, forcing the Kings to trade their 15th pick, Ken Block, for Kelly.

Bill Flett and Poul Popiel were the last players selected in the Draft to be active in the NHL, both playing for the Edmonton Oilers in the 1979–80 season, while Parent, playing in 551 NHL games (not counting his season in the World Hockey Association) had the longest career of any goaltender selected. Popiel was the last player chosen to be active in professional hockey, playing for the Muskegon Mohawks of the International Hockey League in 1982.

By contrast, Don Caley, the 2nd pick of St. Louis, played only a single game for the Blues, the only game of his NHL career.  Career Black Hawk Bill Hay, the 11th pick of the Blues, retired before the Draft; nineteen other skaters played 20 or fewer NHL games after the Draft.

See also 
1967 NHL Amateur Draft
1967–68 NHL season

Notes

References

External links
 1967 NHL Expansion Draft player stats at The Internet Hockey Database

Draft
California Golden Seals
Los Angeles Kings
Minnesota North Stars
National Hockey League expansion drafts
History of the Philadelphia Flyers
Pittsburgh Penguins
St. Louis Blues